Julie Christiansen (born 19 March 1968 in Harstad) is a Norwegian politician for the Conservative Party.

She was elected to the Norwegian Parliament from Akershus in 2001, but was not re-elected in 2005. She had previously served as a deputy representative during the terms 1989–1993, 1993–1997 and 1997–2001.

On the local level, Christiansen was a member of Oppegård municipality council from 1987 to 1995.

She graduated from the University of Oslo as cand.mag. in 1994 and cand.polit. in 2007. She was a research fellow at the Norwegian Atlantic Committee from 1995 to 1997 and at NUPI from 2006 to 2007. A strong European Union proponent, she was the deputy leader of the Norwegian European Movement branch from 1999 to 2001.

References

1968 births
Living people
Conservative Party (Norway) politicians
Members of the Storting
Akershus politicians
People from Oppegård
University of Oslo alumni
Women members of the Storting
21st-century Norwegian politicians
21st-century Norwegian women politicians
People from Harstad